Drissa Camara (born 18 February 2002) is an Ivorian professional football player who plays as a midfielder for Serie B club Parma.

Biography 
Born in Ivory Coast, Camara was sent in Italy through the illegal immigration system built by an Italian talent scout who was later condemned to one year and ten months in prison.

He still became part of the Parma academy, the club having not been found guilty of any charge in this matter.

Club career 
Camara first came to light in the 2019 Torneo di Viareggio, scoring 4 goals in the final stages, including a double in the quarter final victory against Fiorentina, putting his team in a 3–1 lead.

Drissa Camara made his professional debut for Parma Calcio on the 25 November 2020, in a Coppa Italia game against Cosenza Calcio, won 2-1 by the Parmigiani.

References

External links

2002 births
Living people
Ivorian footballers
Association football midfielders
Footballers from Abidjan
Parma Calcio 1913 players
Serie A players
Ivorian expatriate footballers
Expatriate footballers in Italy
Ivorian expatriate sportspeople in Italy